Utrecht is a city in the Netherlands.

Utrecht may also refer to:
 Utrecht (agglomeration), including the city of Utrecht
 Utrecht (province), of which the city of Utrecht is the capital

In history:
 Lordship of Utrecht, precursor of the province
 Episcopal principality of Utrecht, precursor of the lordship
 Archdiocese of Utrecht (695–1580), historic diocese and precursor of the bishopric

Outside the Netherlands:
 Utrecht, KwaZulu-Natal, a South African village named after the Dutch city
 Republic of Utrecht, named after the village
 New Utrecht, Brooklyn, named after the Dutch city

Other uses:
 Roman Catholic Archdiocese of Utrecht, current diocese of Utrecht
 Old Catholic Archdiocese of Utrecht
 Union of Utrecht, treaty signed in 1579, regarded as the foundation of the Dutch Republic
 Union of Utrecht (Old Catholic), a federation of Old Catholic Churches
 Treaty of Utrecht, series of treaties signed in 1713, helped ending the War of the Spanish Succession
 Utrecht University
 FC Utrecht, a Dutch Association football club
 Utrecht Art Supplies, a vendor of fine art materials, based in New Jersey
 Utrecht Caravaggism, a group of painters of the Baroque school in the early part of the seventeenth century
 Utrecht Centraal railway station
 , several ships of the Royal Netherlands Navy